By-elections to the 8th Russian State Duma will be held to fill vacancies in the State Duma between the 2021 election and the 2026 election.

According to article 97 of the Federal Law "On elections of deputies of the State Duma", by-elections are appointed on the second Sunday of September (single voting day), but not less than 85 days before the day of voting. This means that if a vacant seat occurs before a single voting day, but less than 85 days before it, the election will be scheduled for next year. Also, by-elections are not appointed and are not held if, as a result of these elections, a Deputy cannot be elected for a term of more than one year before the end of the constitutional term for which the State Duma was elected.

The first by-elections will be held on 10 September 2023, in at least one constituency.

Overview

10 September 2023

Simferopol
On 3 September 2022, Deputy Alexey Chernyak of Simferopol constituency asked for his resignation from the State Duma to focus on work in Crimea. The request was approved on 13 September, however, the by-election was scheduled for next single election day, 10 September 2023, 372 days after the resignation.

Potential candidates
 Viktor Bout (Liberal Democratic party), entrepreneur, arms dealer, convicted in 2012 in the United States for 25 years in prison for intending to illegally carry out arms trafficking and exchanged in 2022.

References 

2023 elections in Russia
 8
8th State Duma of the Russian Federation
Future elections in Russia